Paul R. Martin (1946–2009) was a psychotherapist, licensed clinical psychologist, author, pastor, and director of the Wellspring Retreat and Resource Center in Ohio.  He also worked in private practice in Athens, Ohio. Martin taught psychology, psychopharmacology, and the Biblical basis of behavior for five years at Geneva College, where he was a member of the department of psychology.

In his 1994 book Cult-Proofing Your Kids, Martin wrote about his former membership and leadership in the Great Commission International (currently called Great Commission Association of Churches). In 1971, he dropped out of graduate school to join the group, when it was known as "The Blitz". He later explained that he left the group when he did not receive an adequate response, after questioning its more controversial methods and tactics.

Career
Martin served as an expert witness in court cases including the Lee Boyd Malvo sniper trial and the trial of Zacarias Moussaoui. Having neither interviewed the defendants nor studied their cases, Martin nonetheless testified in general terms about the mindset of people who have been "indoctrinated".

Published works

Books

Articles and Book chapters

"Post-cult Recovery: Assessment and Rehabilitation". (1993). Langone, Michael D. (ed.). Recovery from Cults: Help for Victims of Psychological and Spiritual Abuse. New York: W.W. Norton. ISBN 9780393701647.

References

American evangelicals
20th-century American psychologists
People of the Christian countercult movement
Former evangelicals
Former members of Evangelical parachurch organizations
Former members of the Great Commission church movement
Great Commission church movement people
American psychotherapists
Researchers of new religious movements and cults
2009 deaths
1946 births
Former members of new religious movements